The Sahtu Dene Council is a council that represents the Sahtu people of the Northwest Territories, Canada. The council signed a comprehensive land claim agreement in 1993 with the Government of Canada, the Sahtu Dene and Metis Comprehensive Land Claim Agreement, for the seven Dene and Métis communities in the Sahtu Region. It is the first such agreement to include three Métis members (Tulita, Fort Good Hope and Norman Wells) in the Northwest Territories. The Sahtu Secretariat Incorporated and various designated organizations implement the agreement and pursue ongoing negotiations. The Sahtu Dene Council represents the four Indian Band councils.

Members
Begade Shotagotine (Tulita Land & Financial Corporation) - Tulita
Behdzi Ahda First Nation (Ayoni Keh Land Corporation) - Colville Lake
Deline First Nation (Deline Got'ine Government) - Deline
K’sasho Go’tine Community Council (Yamogo Land Corporation) - Fort Good Hope

References

External links
Indian and Northern Affairs Canada

Sahtu Region
Politics of the Northwest Territories
First Nations in the Northwest Territories
First Nations tribal councils
Government of the Northwest Territories